Blacatz, known in French genealogy as Blacas de Blacas III (1165–1237), was the feudal lord of Aups and a troubadour. Sordello composed a lament (planh) on his death, inviting the kings of his time to share and eat the heart of Blacatz and thus acquire a portion of his courage.

He was the father of the troubadour Blacasset.

References
Renat Nelli, Ecrivains anticonformistes du moyen-âge occitan. Paris, 1977.

1165 births
1236 deaths
People from Var (department)
13th-century French troubadours
12th-century French troubadours